Orlando is a masculine given name, originally an Italian form of the given name Roland.

Notable people with the name include

A
Orlando Ramón Agosti (1924–1997), Argentinian general
Orlando Allen (1803–1874), American politician
Orlando Álvarez (1952–2016), Puerto Rican baseball player
Orlando Álvarez (lawyer) (1935–2013), Chilean lawyer
Orlando Amêndola (1899–1974), Brazilian swimmer
Orlando Anderson (1974–1998), American murder suspect
Orlando Antigua (born 1973), American basketball coach
Orlando Antonini (born 1944), Italian prelate
Orlando Aravena (born 1942), Chilean footballer
Orlando Arcia (born 1994), Venezuelan baseball player
Orlando Aryee (born 1954), Ghanaian politician
Orlando Azinhais (1933–2005), Portuguese fencer

B
Orlando Baccino (born 1970), Argentinian judoka
Orlando Bailey (born 2001), English rugby union footballer
Orlando Baker (born 1979), Jamaican-American cricketer
Orlando Harrison Baker (1830–1913), American professor
Orlando Bareiro (born 1978), Paraguayan footballer
Orlando M. Barnes (1824–1899), American politician
Orlando Barone (born 1941), Argentinian journalist
Orlando Bates (born 1950), Barbadian cyclist
Orlando Aloysius Battista (1917–1995), Canadian-American chemist
Orlando Bauzon (1944–2020), Filipino basketball player
Orlando Echeverri Benedetti (born 1980), Colombian writer
Orlando Benítez (born 1983), Colombian politician
Orlando Bennett (born 1999), Jamaican hurdler
Orlando Bianchini (born 1955), Italian hammer thrower
Orlando Bloom (born 1977), British actor
Orlando Bobo (1974–2007), American football player
Orlando Bonsignori (??–1273), Italian banker
Orlando Bordón (born 1986), Paraguayan footballer
Orlando Borrego (born 1936), Cuban economist
Orlando Bosch (1926–2011), Cuban militant
Orlando Boss (1844–1931), American army officer
Orlando Charnock Bradley (1871–1937), British veterinarian
Orlando Brandes (born 1946), Brazilian prelate
Orlando Bravo (born 1970), Puerto Rican businessman
Orlando Bridgeman (disambiguation), multiple people
Orlando Brown (disambiguation), multiple people
Orlando Bueso (born 1974), Honduran footballer
Orlando Franklin Bump (1841–1884), American lawyer
Orlando Burrell (1826–1921), American politician
Orlando Bush (1849–1925), Canadian businessman
Orlando Busino (1926–2022), American cartoonist

C
Orlando Cabrera (born 1974), Colombian baseball player
Orlando Cáceres (born 1961), Puerto Rican wrestler
Orlando Calixte (born 1992), Dominican baseball player
Orlando Campos (1925–1994), Indian bridge player
Orlando Canizales (born 1965), American boxer
Orlando Capellino (born 1958), Uruguayan football manager
Orlando Carrió (1955–2002), Argentinian-Mexican actor
Orlando E. Caruana (1844–1917), Maltese-American soldier
Orlando Casares, Argentinian football manager
Orlando Castillo (born 1967), Colombian cyclist
Orlando Catinchi (born 1957), Puerto Rican swimmer
Orlando P. Carvalho, American business executive
Orlando Cepeda (born 1937), Puerto Rican baseball player
Orlando Chavarria (born 1971), Belizean cyclist
Orlando Chaves (disambiguation), multiple people
Orlando Coleman (born 1992), American basketball player
Orlando Colmán (born 2002), Paraguayan footballer
Orlando Conga, American singer
Orlando Contreras (footballer) (born 1982), Peruvian footballer
Orlando Cornejo (1929–2015), Chilean politician
Orlando Corradi (1940–2018), Italian film director
Orlando Cossani (1932–2004), Argentinian swimmer
Orlando Costas (1942–1987), Puerto Rican theologian
Orlando Cowley (born 1953), Cuban water polo player
Orlando Cruz (born 1981), Puerto Rican boxer

D
Orlando da Costa (1929–2006), Portuguese writer
Orlando da Costa (footballer) (born 1985), Brazilian footballer
Orlando Daniels (1860–1927), Canadian politician
Orlando d'Aragona (1296–1361), Italian noble
Orlande de Lassus (1532–1594), Franco-Flemish composer
Orlando de la Torre (1943–2022), Peruvian footballer
Orlando Fortunato de Oliveira (born 1946), Angolan film director
Orlando DiGirolamo (1924–1998), American musician
Orlando Dollente (born 1964), Filipino boxer
Orlando dos Santos Costa (born 1981), Brazilian footballer
Orlando Drummond (1919–2021), Brazilian actor
Orlando Duarte (1932–2020), Brazilian sports journalist
Orlando Duque (born 1974), Colombian diver

E
Orlando Early (born 1967), American basketball coach
Orlando Javier Elizeche (born 1987), Paraguayan runner
Orlando Ellsworth (1813–1872), American politician
Orlando Engelaar (born 1979), Dutch footballer
Orlando Etcheverre (born 1933), Chilean basketball player

F
Orlando Fanasca (born 1983), Italian footballer
Orlando Fedeli (1933–2010), Brazilian historian
Orlando Fenwick (1822–1897), Australian politician
Orlando Ferguson (1846–1911), American cartographer
Orlando Fernández (born 1971), Puerto Rican swimmer
Orlando Fernandez (boxer) (born 1963), Puerto Rican boxer
Orlando Ferrante (born 1932), American football player
Orlando Ferreira (born 1953), Portuguese judoka
Orlando B. Ficklin (1808–1886), American politician
Orlando Figes (born 1959), British historian
Orlando Figuera (1996–2017), Venezuelan activist
Orlando Figueroa (born 1955), Puerto Rican engineer
Orlando Flacco, Italian artist
Orlando García Flores (born 1965), Mexican politician
Orlando Franklin (born 1987), Jamaican American football player
Orlando Fuentes (born 1974), American judoka

G
Orlando Galo (born 2000), Costa Rican footballer
Orlando Gando (born 1992), São Toméan footballer
Orlando Gaona (born 1990), Paraguayan footballer
Orlando Garcia (disambiguation), multiple people
Orlando Garrido (disambiguation), multiple people
Orlando Gee (1619–1705), English politician
Orlando Gibbons (1583–1625), English composer
Orlando Gómez (born 1946), Puerto Rican baseball coach
Orlando Gonçalves (born 1938), Portuguese wrestler
Orlando González (born 1951), Cuban baseball player
Orlando Gough (born 1953), British composer
Orlando Graham (born 1965), American basketball player
Orlando Grootfaam (1974–2019), Surinamese footballer
Orlando Requeijo Gual, Cuban diplomat
Orlando Gutiérrez (disambiguation), multiple people
Orlando Gutiérrez-Boronat (born 1965), Cuban author

H
Orlando J. Heinitz (1921–2007), American businessman and politician
Orlando Hernández (born 1965), Cuban-American baseball player
Orlando Sierra Hernández (1959–2002), Colombian columnist
Orlando Martínez Howley (1944–1975), Dominican journalist
Orlando Huacón (born 1989), Ecuadorian wrestler
Orlando Hubbs (1840–1930), American politician
Orlando Hudson (born 1977), American baseball player
Orlando Huff (born 1978), American football player

I
Orlando Irizarry (born 1985), Puerto Rican volleyball player
Orlando Isales (born 1959), Puerto Rican baseball player

J
Orlando Jewitt (1799–1869), British wood engraver
Orlando Johnson (born 1989), American basketball player
Orlando Jones (born 1968), American comedian and actor
Orlando Jordan (born 1980), American professional wrestler
Orlando Jorge (disambiguation), multiple people
Orlando Julius (1943–2022), Nigerian musician

K
Orlando Kellogg (1809–1865), American politician

L
Orlando Lagos (1913–2007), Chilean photographer
Orlando Lampa (1944–2020), Filipino runner
Orlando Lansdorf (1965–2021), Surinamese drag queen
Orlando Lanza (1932–1999), Cuban rower
Orlando Paredes Lara (born 1940), Mexican politician
Orlando Lattmann (born 1989), Swiss footballer
Orlando Lavalle (born 1969), Peruvian football manager
Orlando Luis Pardo Lazo (born 1971), Cuban writer
Orlando le Fleming (born 1976), English cricketer and musician
Orlando Lelé (1949–1999), Brazilian footballer
Orlando Leopardi (1902–1972), Italian boxer
Orlando Letelier (1932–1976), Chilean economist
Orlando Lightfoot (born 1974), American basketball player
Orlando Castro Llanes (1925–2014), Venezuelan businessman
Orlando Llenza (1930–2021), Puerto Rican general
Orlando Lorenzini (1890–1941), Italian general
Orlando Lourenco (born 1964), Zimbabwean tennis player
Orlando Lowry (born 1961), American football player
Orlando Lübbert (born 1945), Chilean screenwriter
Orlando Luz (born 1998), Brazilian tennis player

M
Orlando Madrigal (1921–1991), Costa Rican judoka
Orlando Maldonado (born 1959), Puerto Rican boxer
Orlando Malone (born 1963), American boxer
Orlando H. Manning (1847–1909), American politician
Orlando Marin (born 1935), American musician
Orlando Marín (1942–2014), Colombian footballer
Orlando R. Marsh (1881–1938), American electrical engineer
Orlando L. Martin (1872–1951), American politician
Orlando Martínez (1944–2021), Cuban boxer
Orlando Martins (1899–1985), Nigerian actor
Orlando Maturana (born 1965), Colombian footballer
Orlando McDaniel (1960–2020), American football player
Orlando McFarlane (1938–2007), Cuban baseball player
Orlando McKay (born 1969), American football player
Orlando Meléndez (born 1979), Puerto Rican basketball player
Orlando Mendes (1916–1990), Mozambican biologist 
Orlando Méndez-Valdez (born 1986), Mexican-American basketball player
Orlando Ricardo Menes (born 1958), Cuban-American poet
Orlando Jorge Mera (1966–2022), Dominican politician
Orlando Mercado (born 1961), Puerto Rican baseball player
Orlando S. Mercado (born 1946), Filipino politician
Orlando Merced (born 1966), Puerto Rican baseball player
Orlando Merlini (??–1510), Italian painter
Orlando C. Merriman (1827–1906), American politician
Orlando Miguel (born 1969), Cuban-Mexican actor
Orlando Miller (born 1969), American baseball player
Orlando Pérez Moguel (born 1965), Mexican politician
Orlando Mohorović (born 1950), Croatian artist
Orlando Monteiro (born 1972), Cape Verdean footballer
Orlando Mora (born 1960), Costa Rican runner
Orlando Morgan (1865–1956), English composer

N
Orlando Nadres (1938–1991), Filipino actor
Orlando Nappe (1931–2007), Argentinian footballer
Orlando Narváez (born 1958), Ecuadorian footballer
Orlando Neto (born 1979), Portuguese footballer
Orlando Niebles (born 1985), Colombian footballer
Orlando Norie (1832–1901), British artist

O
Orlando Oberto (born 1980), Italian baseball player
Orlando Olcese, Peruvian academic administrator
Orlando Paladino Orlandini (1905–1986), Italian sculptor 
Orlando Ortiz Chevres (born 1978), Puerto Rican politician
Orlando Otey (1925–2011), Mexican pianist

P
Orlando Pace (born 1975), American football player
Orlando Paden (born 1984), American politician
Orlando Palacios (born 1954), Cuban boxer
Orlando Palmeiro (born 1969), American baseball player
Orlando Pantera (1967–2001), Cape Verdean singer
Orlando Parga (born 1939), Puerto Rican politician
Orlando Parker (born 1972), American football player
Orlando Patterson (born 1940), Jamaican sociologist
Orlando Peçanha (1935–2010), Brazilian footballer
Orlando Peña (born 1933), Cuban baseball player
Orlando Peña (musician) (1928–1994), Cuban bassist
Orlando Peralta (born 1930), Argentinian basketball player
Orlando Perez (born 1977), American soccer player
Orlando Peters (born 1988), Antiguan cricketer
Orlando Petinatti (born 1968), Uruguayan radio personality
Orlando Henderson Petty (1874–1932), American politician
Orlando Phillips (born 1960), American basketball player
Orlando Pingo de Ouro (1923–2004), Brazilian footballer
Orlando Metcalfe Poe (1832–1895), American general
Orlando Pineda (born 1986), Mexican footballer
Orlando Pizzolato (born 1958), Italian runner
Orlando Plagata (1933/1934–2005), Filipino football manager
Orlando Plummer (1836–1913), American politician
Orlando Polanco (born 1999), Cuban judoka
Orlando Polmonari (1924–2014), Italian gymnast
Orlando B. Potter (1823–1894), American businessman and politician
Orlando Prado (born 1972), Peruvian footballer

Q
Orlando Quintana (born 1978), Spanish footballer

R
Orlando Ramírez (born 1951), Colombian baseball player
Orlando Ramos, American politician
Orlando Ribeiro (disambiguation), multiple people
Orlando Rincón (born 1985), Mexican footballer
Orlando Ríos (1947–2008), Cuban percussionist
Orlando Rivas (born 1950), Colombian footballer
Orlando Mejía Rivera (born 1961), Colombian writer
Orlando Robinson (born 2000), American basketball player
Orlando Rodrigues (born 1969), Portuguese cyclist
Orlando Rodrigues (sailor) (1932–2000), Portuguese sailor
Orlando Rodríguez (disambiguation), multiple people
Orlando Román (born 1978), Puerto Rican baseball player
Orlando Romero (born 1960), Peruvian boxer
Orlando Rosa (born 1977), Puerto Rican wrestler
Orlando Aponte Rosario (born 1984), Puerto Rican politician
Orlando Rossardi (born 1938), Cuban poet
Orlando Ruíz (born 1935), Cuban fencer
Orlando Ruff (born 1976), American football player

S
Orlando Sá (born 1988), Portuguese footballer
Orlando Sabino (1946–2013), Brazilian serial killer
Orlando Sain (1912–??), Italian footballer
Orlando Salido (born 1980), Mexican boxer
Orlando Samuell (born 1946), Cuban volleyball player
Orlando Sánchez (disambiguation), multiple people
Orlando Santamaría (1920–1992), Cuban sports shooter
Orlando Savarin (born 1938), Italian rower
Orlando Scandrick (born 1987), American football player
Orlando D. Schärer, Swiss biologist
Orlando Sconza (born 1960), Argentinian professor
Orlando Segatore (1923–2016), Canadian football player
Orlando Sérgio (born 1960), Angolan actor
Orlando Serrell (born 1968), American savant
Orlando Silva (born 1929), Chilean basketball player
Orlando Silvestri (born 1972), French footballer
Orlando Sinclair (born 1998), Costa Rican footballer
Orlando Sirola (1928–1995), Italian tennis player
Orlando Smart (born 1971), American basketball player
Orlando Smeekes (born 1981), Curaçaoan footballer
Orlando Smith (born 1944), British Virgin Islands politician
Orlando J. Smith (1842–1908), American philosopher
Orlando Stevens (1797–1879), American politician
Orlando Strange (1826–1906), Canadian politician

T
Orlando Teani (1910–1972), Italian cyclist
Orlando Terranova (born 1979), Argentinian racing driver
Orlando Thomas (1972–2014), American football player
Orlando Torres (born 1946), Venezuelan footballer
Orlando Guerrero Torres, Venezuelan bishop
Orlando Trustfull (born 1970), Dutch football manager

U
Orlando Urbano (born 1984), Italian footballer
Orlando Urdaneta (born 1950), Venezuelan actor

V
Orlando Varona (1925–1977), Cuban baseball player
Orlando Vásquez (disambiguation), multiple people
Orlando P. Vaughan (1848–1925), American politician
Orlando Vega (born 1968), Puerto Rican basketball player
Orlando Vela (born 1994), Mexican footballer
Orlando Ventura (born 1948), Mexican field hockey player
Orlando Jorge Villegas (born 1991), Dominican politician
Orlando von Einsiedel (born 1980), British film director
Orlando Voorn (born 1968), Dutch disc jockey

W
Orlando F. Wallihan (1833–1912), American politician
Orlando Ward (1891–1972), American army officer
Orlando Watters (born 1971), American football player
Orlando Weld-Forester (1813–1894), British politician
Orlando Wellington, Ghanaian football manager
Orlando Wells (born 1973), English actor
Orlando Whistlecraft (1810–1893), English meteorologist
Orlando Wiet (born 1965), Surinamese boxer
Orlando B. Wilcox (1823–1907), American soldier
Orlando Wilson (television presenter) (born 1947), American television personality
Orlando Wirht (born 1981), Dutch footballer
Orlando Woolridge (1959–2012), American basketball player

Y
Orlando Yntema (born 1986), Dutch baseball player

Z
Orlando Zapata (1967–2010), Cuban human rights activist

References

See also
Orlando (surname), a page for people surnamed "Orlando"
Orlando (disambiguation), a disambiguation page for "Orlando"
 

African-American given names
English masculine given names
Italian masculine given names